Mateo Martinelli (born January 9, 1985 in Rosario, Argentina) is an Argentine Association Football Midfielder currently playing for Club Unión (Villa Krause) in Argentina.

Teams
  Independiente Rivadavia 2006-2008
  Guillermo Brown de Puerto Madryn 2008
  Curicó Unido 2009
  Talleres de Córdoba 2010-2011
  Defensores de Belgrano 2011-2012
  Unión Mar del Plata 2012-2013
  San Marcos de Arica 2013-2014
  Club Unión (Villa Krause) 2014-

External links
 
 

1985 births
Living people
Argentine footballers
Argentine expatriate footballers
Defensores de Belgrano footballers
Independiente Rivadavia footballers
Guillermo Brown footballers
Talleres de Córdoba footballers
Curicó Unido footballers
Chilean Primera División players
Expatriate footballers in Chile
Association football midfielders
Footballers from Rosario, Santa Fe